A smoot is a jocular unit of measurement equal to 5 feet 7 inches (1.702 m).

Smoot or Smoots may also refer to:

Places
 Smoots, Virginia, US
 Smoot, West Virginia, US
 Smoot, Wyoming, US
 Smoots Creek, a river in Kansas

People
 Abraham O. Smoot (1815–1895), mayor of Salt Lake City, Utah, US
 Dan Smoot (1913–2003), FBI agent and conservative political activist
 Dawuane Smoot (born 1995), American football player
 Fred Smoot (born 1979), American football player
 George Smoot (born 1945), astrophysics scientist at Lawrence Berkeley National Laboratory and Nobel prize laureate in Physics, 2006
 Julianna Smoot, political fundraiser for the Democratic Party
 L. Douglas Smoot (born 1934), American chemical engineer
 Oliver R. Smoot (born 1940), former head of ISO and ANSI, for whom the unit was named
 Reed Smoot (1862–1941), Senator from Utah, sponsor of the Smoot-Hawley Tariff and son of Abraham O. Smoot
 Reed Smoot (cinematographer), a United States cinematographer

Characters
 Smoot, half of Canadian horror clown duo Mump and Smoot
 Midge Smoot, a fictional character from Shining Time Station

Law
 Smoot–Hawley Tariff Act 1930 US protectionist trade legislation